

LGBT rights

The LGBT community has been gaining some rights in the first years of the 21st century. On 29 April 2003, the Federal Law to Prevent and Eliminate Discrimination was passed. The law, which has been criticized as insufficient, gives rise to the creation of the National Council to Prevent Discrimination (Consejo Nacional para Prevenir la Discriminación, CONAPRED), which is in charge of receiving and settling cases of discrimination, as well as "develop[ing] actions to protect all citizens from every distinction or exclusion based on ethnic or national origin, sex, age, disability, social or economic condition, conditions of health, pregnancy, language, religion, beliefs, sexual preferences, marital status or any other, that prevents or annuls the acknowledgement or the exercise of the rights and the real equality of opportunities of persons".

In November 2006, the Law for Coexistence Partnerships was enacted in the Federal District. Called "gay law" in the mass  media, this legal arrangement is not orientated exclusively to the homosexual population. The law, in effect since its publication in the official newspaper of the capital city government on 16 March 2007, gives almost the same rights as a married couple within the limits of the Federal District, with the exception of adoption.

The first Mexican state to legalize same-sex civil unions was Coahuila on 11 January 2007, under the name of "civil solidarity agreement".  The Coahuilan congress modified the civil code to introduce the new form of cohabitation. The law allows similar rights to marriage but prohibits adoption by same-sex couples.  On March 4, 2010, Mexico City's law allowing same-sex marriage took effect, despite an appeal by the Attorney-General of the Republic, making Mexico the first Latin American country to allow same-sex marriage by non-judicial means. On 12 March 2010, Mexico City held its first same-sex wedding, which will be recognized throughout the Mexican territory.

In spite of these advances, in 2006, the Mexican population was primarily against same-sex marriage.  In a survey by Parametría, 61% of those surveyed responded "no" when asked if they supported an amendment to the constitution to legalize gay marriage. Only some 17% responded affirmatively, and some 14% did not give an opinion. In the same survey, some 41% were against the possibility of giving the same rights enjoyed by a married couple to a registered same-sex couple, and only 28% supported this possibility.

LGBT movement

LGBT people in Mexico have organized in a variety of ways: through local organizations, marches, and the development of a Commission to Denounce Hate Crimes. Mexico has a thriving LGBT movement with organizations in various large cities throughout the country and numerous LGBT publications, most prominently in Mexico City, Guadalajara, Monterrey, Tijuana, and Puebla. The vast majority of these publications exist at the local level, with national efforts often falling apart before they take root.

Societal prejudices and terminologies

Anthropologist Joseph M. Carrier suggests that, unlike the U.S., in Mexico, a man's masculine gender and heterosexual identity are not threatened by a homosexual act as long as he plays the inserter's role.

The terms used to refer to homosexual Mexican men are generally coded with gendered meaning drawn from the inferior position of women in patriarchal Mexican society. The most benign of the contemptuous terms is maricón, a label that highlights the non-conforming gender attributes of the (feminine) homosexual man, equivalent to sissy or fairy in American English. However, to most Mexicans (gay or straight), the term maricón is highly offensive and is more an equivalent to the Canadian or American term "faggot". Terms such as joto or puto, on the other hand, speak to the passive sexual role taken by these men rather than merely their gender attributes, according to Carrier.

However, to the average Mexican, "joto" or "puto" is highly pejorative and has nothing to do with sexual roles (top or bottom).  "Puto" can also refer to a guy who sells himself for money. They are more derogatory and vulgar in that they underscore the sexually non-conforming nature of their passive/receptive position in the homosexual act. The invective associated with all these appellations speaks to the way effeminate homosexual men are viewed as having betrayed the Mexican man's prescribed gender and sexual role. There are also some regional variants such as leandro, lilo, mariposón, and puñal, among others.

Carrier also suggests that homosexuality is rigidly circumscribed by the prominent role the family plays in structuring homosexual activity. In Mexico, the traditional family remains a crucial institution that defines both gender and sexual relations between men and women. The concealment, suppression, or prevention of any open acknowledgment of homosexual activity underscores the stringency of culture surrounding gender and sexual norms in Mexican family life.

Overall, however, men and women who self-identify as homosexuals in urban areas have created social networks and found public spaces for socialization without much social interference. Because of Mexican expectations that sexual differences be dealt with "sexual silence" and fear of discrimination in the family, school, and workplace, it is common for gay men and lesbians to be cautious in disclosing their sexual orientation. Leading "double lives" is often seen as necessary to ensure that one's connections with the non-homosexual world remain intact.

Public opinion 

Some 71% of Mexican youth would not approve if the same rights were given to homosexuals as heterosexuals. A 2006 survey states that 33% of Mexicans feel aversion for homosexuals, some 40% don't like politicians who emphasize homosexuality, and some 32% don't like homosexual neighbors. Homophobia is also deeply rooted in the family. In 2004, only four families of those murdered in homophobic crimes, of a total of 26, offered to give information on the matter to an investigation commission.

In Mexico City, in 2004, of 125 corpses of homosexuals, only 75 were claimed by their relatives; for thirteen others, the family came only to the identification; the family of the rest did not approach the funeral home, despite having been informed. There exist signs that Mexican youth are being committed to psychiatric clinics after coming out to their family. Some 16% have been rejected by family, and a greater percentage have been physically attacked by relatives.

Popular culture encourages this attitude.  The rock group Molotov released the song "Puto" on their 1997 album ¿Dónde Jugarán las Niñas?. The lyrics of the song contain phrases like "Marica nena mas bien putín, Puto nace, puto se muere, Amo a matón / matarile al maricón / ¿¡y que quiere este hijo de puta!? / quiere llorar, Puto, le faltan tanates al / ¡puto! / le falta topiates / ¡puto! / le faltan tanates al puto puto". The producer, Gustavo Santaolalla, in some statements to the magazine Retila, stated that the word "puto" had not been used in the sense of "gay" but in the sense of "coward" or "loser", which is also used in Mexico.

LGBT mental health 
The consequences for the LGBT community are shown in the UAM study, which states that 27% of LGBT persons studied suffer mental disorders and risk of alcoholism, some 40% have thoughts of suicide, and 25% have attempted it.

Machismo in Mexican culture

According to Andrew A. Reding, homosexuals remain, for the most part, invisible for two reasons. The first, which helps explain why there are no residential gay districts in Mexico, is that Mexicans tend to reside with their families far longer than their counterparts in the US. This is in part for economic reasons. Low incomes and scarce housing keep many living with their parents, as does the fact that in the absence of a government social welfare system, the family is the primary bulwark of social security. Even wealthy Mexican homosexuals often continue to live at home, acquiring a separate lodging as a meeting place for their sexual partners.

The second major reason gay men and lesbians remain invisible is the strong social stigma attached to homosexuality, particularly where it comes into conflict with the highly accentuated and differentiated sexual roles prescribed by machismo.

But machismo is as much about power relationships among men as it is about establishing the
dominance of men over women.

Transgressions against machismo 

Machismo has important implications for how most Mexicans view homosexuality. Homophobia is far more intensely directed against those who violate norms of male and female conduct. This is especially pronounced among men, where effeminate behavior elicits far greater levels of social disapproval than does homosexuality per se. In the machista perspective, a man's greatest offense against the norm is to not act like a man.

Effeminacy and cross-dressing are serious violations of the masculine ideal. But the greatest transgression is for a man to assume the sexual role of a woman in intercourse. The man who penetrates another man remains masculine. The man who is penetrated loses his masculinity and incurs by far the greater social stigma.

The focus on masculinity has serious consequences. It means that most Mexican gay or bisexual males, regardless of the sexual roles they assume in private, are at pains to project a manly image in public. The relative few who are unable to do so are therefore highly exposed and subject to ridicule and harassment, to say nothing of discrimination in employment.

Because the vast majority of the homosexual population remains hidden from view, homosexuality becomes identified in the minds of many with prostitution, disease, and cross-dressing. That reinforces a vicious cycle, as prejudice keeps homosexuality underground, and the few surface manifestations of homosexuality reinforce prejudice. It also means that transvestites are subject to hatred, harassment, and police abuse. Police abuse stems not only from popular prejudice but also from the fact that street prostitution is illegal in certain jurisdictions such as Mexico City. Mexican police, whose wages tend to be very low, are notorious for corruption, extorting money from citizens. The notion of transgender, understood in terms that go beyond the demeanor-based identities of transvestites (vestidas or travestis), is of recent arrival in Mexico.

Social views about Lesbianism 
In the gender-based classificatory system in Mexico, masculine women typically have been assumed to reject men or to want to be like them. This notion is captured in derogatory labels such as machorra and marimacha. Other derogatory terms, such as chancla or chanclera and tortillera, denote the perception that "real" sex cannot happen in the absence of a penis. Because machismo is by definition male-oriented, and is premised on male dominance in relations between the sexes, lesbian relationships are generally perceived as far less threatening to society. That is, to the extent that they are perceived at all, because to a great degree they remain invisible in a cultural context that gives little recognition to female sexuality in the first place.

That helps explain the view often expressed among Mexican men that lesbians are just women who have not experienced "real" sex with a "real" man. In that sense, lesbians suffer much the same treatment as other women in a society that so exalts the masculine over the feminine.

Violence against LGBT people

Homophobia is very widespread in Mexican society. Statisticians show that between 2002 and 2007 alone, 1,000 people have been murdered in homophobic crimes, as the Chamber of Deputies revealed in May 2007, making Mexico the county with the second-highest rate of homophobic crimes in the world (after Brazil). In a journalistic study by Fernando del Collado, titled Homofobia, odio, crimen y justicia (Homophobia, Hate, Crime, and Justice), there were discussed 400 dead between 1995 and 2005, that is to say, some three murders a month. The City Commission Against Homophobic Hate Crimes calculates that only one in four crimes is reported.

From January to August 2009, 40 gay people were murdered in Michoacán alone, nearly all of them in the Tierra Caliente area. The great majority are against gay men; from 1995 to 2004, "only" sixteen women had been murdered. The crimes are often ignored or investigated with little interest by the police forces, who give impunity to the criminal in 98% of cases.

Other forms of less serious violence are classified into the following types, according to a 2007 study by the Metropolitan Autonomous University (UAM) Xochimilco campus: verbal attack in 32% of cases, sexual harassment in 18%, harassment in 12%, following or pursuit in 12%, and threats in 11%. According to the UAM study, the most frequent types of discrimination "were not hiring for a job, 13 percent; threats of extortion and detention by police, 11 percent; and abuse of employees, 10 percent".

Roman Catholic Church
Reinforcing attitudes toward homosexuality in Mexican culture is the stance of the Roman Catholic Church. Mexico City's Cardinal Norberto Rivera denounces "euphemisms" that contribute to "moral disorientation". "The arguments expressed by those who sympathize with this current that favors sexual libertinism, often appear under humanist banners, although at root they manifest materialist ideologies that deny the transcendent nature of the human person, as well as the supernatural vocation of the individual." The complementary union of man and
woman, he says, is the only relationship capable of generating "true conjugal love." Anti-gay rhetoric is still acceptable in parts of the country where the influence of the Catholic Church is strongest.

The new Catechism of the Catholic Church describes homosexual acts as a "grave depravity" and
"intrinsically disordered". It states that lesbian and gay relationships are "contrary to natural law [...] they do not proceed from a genuine affective and sexual complementarity. Under no circumstances can they be approved." Recognizing that "the number of men and women who have deep-seated homosexual tendencies is not negligible", it specifies that "they must be accepted with respect, compassion, and sensitivity," avoiding "every sign of unjust discrimination." Yet it mandates that "homosexual persons are called to chastity."

Tolerance among indigenous peoples
Even though Mexico's majority mestizo, racially mixed and assimilated, culture, permeated by machismo, is hostile to male homosexuality, particularly in its more effeminate manifestations, some of its indigenous cultures are a lot more tolerant. Isthmus Zapotecs and Yucatán Mayans are cases in point. Particularly, the Zapotecs developed the concept of a third gender, which they referred to as muxe, as an intermediate between male and female.

Somewhat androgynous, they do both women's and men's work. While their apparel can be somewhat flamboyant, they are more masculine than feminine in dress. A muxe status is recognized in childhood, and as Zapotec parents consider the muxes to be the brightest, most gifted children, they will keep them in school longer than other children. It is widely believed that they are artistically gifted, and do better work than women.

More recently, muxes have been able to use their relatively high levels of education to gain important footholds in the more prestigious white-collar jobs in government and business that constitute the social elite in their communities. They have also been getting elected to political office, benefiting from the public perception that they are intelligent and gifted.

According to Chiñas, "Isthmus Zapotec culture allows both women and men more freedom to express affection in public for persons of the same sex than does Anglo North American culture." In the special case of fiestas, however, heterosexual men are expected to not engage in any bodily contact with either men or women while dancing. Women, on the other hand, are allowed to dance with each other, and muxes may dance with each other or with women.

Though not necessarily approving such liaisons, Isthmus Zapotec society is tolerant of persons who publicly form same-sex couples, whether male or female. Both types of couples occur with comparable frequency. Zapotecs are also tolerant of bisexuality and transvestism. Chiñas affirms that she seldom witnessed any instances of ostracism based on sexual orientation or same-sex liaisons.

The Zapatista Army of National Liberation (EZLN), a mostly indigenous and armed revolutionary group, on 1 January 1994, the same day the North American Free Trade Agreement (NAFTA) went into effect, began a rebellion against the Mexican government in the southern state of Chiapas, the country's poorest. They have included in several proclamations to the nation "the homosexuals" as an oppressed group along with indigenous peoples, women and peasants.

See also

 LGBT culture in Mexico
 LGBT history in Mexico
 LGBT people in Mexico
 LGBT rights in Mexico
LGBT in Argentina
LGBT in Chile
LGBT in Colombia
 Guadalajara Gay Pride
 Zona Romántica

Footnotes

References

 Peter M. Nardi and Beth E. Schneider. Social perspectives in lesbian and gay studies: a reader. Routledge, 1998. 625 p.  .
 John Middlemist Herrick and Paul H. Stuart. Encyclopedia of social welfare history in North America. SAGE, 2005. 534 p.  .
 Don M. Coerver, Suzanne B. Pasztor, Robert Buffington. Mexico: an encyclopedia of contemporary culture and history. ABC-CLIO, 2004. 621 p. .
 Yolanda C. Padilla. Gay and lesbian rights organizing: community-based strategies. Routledge, 2004. 235 p.  .
 Ben Sifuentes-Jáuregui. Transvestism, masculinity, and Latin America literature: genders share flesh. Palgrave Macmillan, 2002. 240 p. .
 Louis Crompton. Homosexuality & Civilization. Harvard University Press, 2006. 623 p. .
 Wayne R. Dynes, Warren Johansson, William A. Percy, Stephen Donaldson. Encyclopedia of homosexuality, Volume 2. Garland Pub., 1990. 1484 p. .

 George E. Haggerty. Gay histories and cultures: an encyclopedia. Taylor & Francis, 2000. 986 p.  .
 Rudi Bleys. Images of ambiente: homotextuality and Latin American art, 1810-today. Continuum International Publishing Group, 2000. 244 p.  .
 Alfonso G. Jiménez de Sandi Valle, Luis Alberto de la Garza Becerra and Napoleón Glockner Corte. LGBT Pride Parade in Mexico City. National Autonomous University of Mexico (UNAM), 2009. 25 p.
 Andrew A. Reding. Mexico: Update on Treatment of Homosexuals. U.S. Citizenship and Migration Services. May, 2000. 37 p.
 María de Jesús González Pérez. LGBT Pride Parade. Metropolitan Autonomous University - Azcapotzalco. El Cotidiano. May–June, 2005. 90-97 p.

External links

Informative
 National Council to Prevent Discrimination — official website.
 National Center for the Prevention and Control of HIV/AIDS — official website.
 Anodis — Mexican news agency about sexual diversity.

Other
 Gay Mexico — gay online magazine.
 MexGay — information about gay-friendly tourist destinations in Mexico.

 

es:Homosexualidad en México